Northland may refer to:

Corporations
 Northland Organic Foods Corporation, headquartered in Saint Paul, Minnesota
 Northland Resources, a mining business
 Northland Communications, an American cable television, telephone and internet service provider
 Northland Properties, the parent company of multiple hotel chains, restaurants, sports teams and properties

Places
 Northland (New Zealand electorate), northern New Zealand
 Northland, Wellington, New Zealand
 Northland Peninsula, northern New Zealand
 Northland Region, northern New Zealand
 Northland, Waupaca County, Wisconsin, US
 Northland Pyrite Mine, Canada
 The Northland, a section of the Kansas City metropolitan area, US

Shopping centres
 Northland Center, in Southfield, Michigan
 Northland Mall, a demolished shopping mall in Columbus, Ohio
 Northland Mall (Appleton, Wisconsin), in Appleton, Wisconsin
 Northland Shopping Centre, in Melbourne, Australia
 Northland Village Mall, in Calgary, Alberta
 Buzz Westfall Plaza on the Boulevard, formerly Northland Shopping Center, in Jennings, Missouri

Schools
 Northland International University, formerly Northland Baptist Bible College, in Dunbar, Wisconsin
 Northland Christian School, a high school in Houston, Texas
 Northland College (Wisconsin), in Ashland, Wisconsin
 Northland Community and Technical College, in East Grand Forks, Minnesota
 Northland High School (Columbus, Ohio)
 Northland Pioneer College, in Holbrook, Arizona
 Northland Primary School, in Singapore

Transportation

Ships
 USCGC Northland (WPG-49), a cutter in service from 1927–1946
 USCGC Northland (WMEC-904), a cutter in service since 1984

Trains
 Northland (railcar), a passenger car in Duluth, Minnesota, on the U.S. National Register of Historic Places
 Northlander, a Canadian passenger train formerly operated by the Ontario Northland Railway

Other uses
 Northland (film), directed by Ernest Borneman
 Northland (Shannara), a fictional location in the Shannara novel series by Terry Brooks
 Northland (women's field hockey team), an amateur team in New Zealand
 Northland Rugby Union, New Zealand

See also 
 Northlands (disambiguation)
 Nordland, a county in Norway
 Norrland, an area of Sweden